Yingzhou is a town in Jixi County, Anhui, China.

Towns in Anhui